Clement Ellis Conger (October 15, 1912 – January 11, 2004) was an American museum curator and public servant. He served as director of the U.S. Department of State Office of Fine Arts, where in that role he worked as curator of both the Diplomatic Reception Rooms and Blair House. He also served as Curator of the White House, at the pleasure of Presidents Nixon, Ford, Carter, and Reagan. Prior to working as a curator, Conger served as a Foreign Service Officer, as the Deputy Chief of Protocol of the United States and as the Assistant Secretary of the Combined Chiefs of Staff.

Life

He graduated from Strayer College. He worked as an office manager for the Chicago Tribune, and for U.S. Rubber Co. He was assistant secretary for the Combined Chiefs of Staff, during World War II. He worked for the State Department, and became deputy chief of protocol, from 1958 to 1961. In 1992, he received the Henry Francis du Pont Award from the Winterthur Museum, Garden and Library, which recognizes awardees' "contributions of national significance to the knowledge, preservation, and enjoyment of American decorative arts, architecture, landscape design, and gardens."

Works
Clement E. Conger, Mary K. Itsell, Treasures of State: Fine and Decorative Art in the Diplomatic Reception Rooms of the U.S. Department of State, H.N. Abrams, 1991,

References

External links

Reminiscences of Clement Conger : oral history, 1972., Columbia University

http://leg1.state.va.us/cgi-bin/legp504.exe?041+ful+SJ187+pdf
https://web.archive.org/web/20111012205352/http://thenewnixon.org/2009/10/05/pat-nixon-and-the-golden-age-of-the-white-house/
https://web.archive.org/web/20110826141712/http://sackheritage.com/articles/articles.php?articleID=13

1912 births
2004 deaths
People from Harrisonburg, Virginia
White House Curators
George H. W. Bush administration personnel
Reagan administration personnel
Carter administration personnel
Ford administration personnel
Nixon administration personnel